Li Xiaowen (2 March 1947 – 10 January 2015) was a Chinese scientist and professor at Beijing Normal University.

Biography
Li was born in Zigong, Sichuan, on March 2, 1947, with his ancestral home in Guichi District of Chizhou, Anhui. He graduated from University of Electronic Science and Technology of China in 1968. After the Cultural Revolution, he went to United States of America to study at University of California, Santa Barbara, he earned a master's degree in geography and PhD in Electrical and Computer Engineering. After graduation, he taught at Beijing Normal University, he was  Deputy Dean of the Environmental Science College of Beijing Normal University. He was named a Changjiang Scholar by the Ministry of Education of the People's Republic of China. In 2001, he was elected an academician of the Chinese Academy of Sciences.

On January 10, 2015, he died in Beijing.

Personal life
Li and his wife, Mrs Wu, had two daughters, who live in the United States.

References

1947 births
2015 deaths
Academic staff of Beijing Normal University
Members of the Chinese Academy of Sciences
People from Zigong
University of California, Santa Barbara alumni
University of Electronic Science and Technology of China alumni